The 2014–15 Irani Cup, also called 2014-15 Irani Trophy, will be the 53rd season of the Irani Cup, a first-class cricket competition in India. It will be a one-off match to be played from 17 March to 21 March 2015 between the 2014–15 Ranji champions Karnataka and the Rest of India team. Chinnaswamy Stadium, the home ground of Karnataka, will host the match.

Squads

1 Reddy replaced KL Rahul who was ruled out of the Irani Cup with an injury.

Scorecard 
Rest of India won the toss and elected to field

Innings 1

Fall of wickets: 1-26 (Uthappa, 7.5 ov), 2-66 (Samarth, 21.4 ov), 3-90 (Pandey, 32.3 ov), 4-107 (Agarwal, 36.4 ov), 5-220 (Reddy, 64.6 ov), 6-220 (Nair, 65.1 ov), 7-226 (Vinay Kumar, 65.5 ov), 8-242 (Gopal, 76.1 ov), 9-244 (Aravind, 76.3 ov), 10-244 (Mithun, 77.1 ov)

Innings 2

Fall of wickets: 1-0 (Chand, 0.1 ov), 2-23 (Jiwanjot Singh, 6.2 ov), 3-72 (Dogra, 22.1 ov), 4-90 (NV Ojha, 27.4 ov), 5-102 (Tiwary, 30.4 ov), 6-182 (Yadav, 54.1 ov), 7-218 (Dhawan, 62.2 ov), 8-219 (Jadhav, 62.4 ov), 9-242 (Thakur, 68.1 ov), 10-264 (Aaron, 75.4 ov)

Innings 3

Fall of wickets: 1-54 (Agarwal, 13.5 ov), 2-105 (Reddy, 32.1 ov), 3-121 (Uthappa, 35.3 ov), 4-182 (Samarth, 51.3 ov), 5-288 (Nair, 78.4 ov), 6-289 (Gopal, 79.3 ov), 7-354 (Vinay Kumar, 100.6 ov), 8-390 (Mithun, 104.5 ov), 9-408 (Aravind, 106.3 ov), 10-422 (Sharath, 110.3 ov)

References

External links
 Tournament home on ESPNcricinfo

Irani Cup
2015 in Indian cricket
Irani Cup